The Hastings Adobe near Collinsville, California is a structure that was listed on the National Register of Historic Places in 1972.  It is currently on private property and is inaccessible to the public.

Hastings was a lawyer and writer of an "Emigrant Guide" to California;  he promoted the Hastings Cutoff, which was a major factor in the Donner party disaster.

References

History of Solano County, California
Buildings and structures in Solano County, California
National Register of Historic Places in Solano County, California
Houses on the National Register of Historic Places in California